Dexter Lawrence II (born November 12, 1997), nicknamed "Sexy Dexy", is an American football nose tackle for the New York Giants of the National Football League (NFL). He played college football at Clemson. In 2015, he concluded his high school football career at Wake Forest High School in Wake Forest. He was ranked as the No. 2 recruit in college football's incoming Class of 2016.

High school career
Lawrence played his whole high school career at Wake Forest High School. During his high school career, he had 28.0 sacks, 204 tackles, 6 forced fumbles and 1 interception.

Recruiting
Lawrence was seen as the best prospect to ever come out of the state of North Carolina. He considered multiple schools, including Clemson Tigers, Florida Gators, Florida State Seminoles, Alabama Crimson Tide and NC State Wolfpack. In the end he signed with Clemson.

College career
In 2016, Lawrence played in 12 games for the Tigers at defensive tackle.  Throughout the regular season, he recorded 55 tackles and 5 sacks. The 5 sacks he recorded in his freshman year is a Clemson record. Lawrence beat the previous record of 4 set by William Perry, Ricky Sapp, and Shaq Lawson. Lawrence was subsequently named the 2016 ACC Defensive Rookie of the Year. Lawrence was part of the Clemson team that defeated Alabama in the 2017 College Football Playoff National Championship by a score of 35–31. In the game, he recorded four total tackles. Dexter was ruled ineligible for the 2019 College Football Playoff after testing positive for the banned substance ostarine. After the season, Lawrence decided to forgo his senior year and enter the 2019 NFL Draft.

College statistics

Professional career

Lawrence injured his left leg during his attempt at the 40-yard dash during the 2019 NFL Combine.

Lawrence was selected by the New York Giants with the 17th overall pick in the 2019 NFL Draft. The Giants originally acquired the selection as part of a trade that sent Odell Beckham Jr. to the Cleveland Browns.

In week 3 against the Tampa Bay Buccaneers, Lawrence recorded his first career sack on Jameis Winston in the 32-31 win.
In week 5 against the Minnesota Vikings, Lawrence recorded a sack and a forced fumble on Kirk Cousins in the 28-10 loss.

In Week 1 of the 2020 season against the Pittsburgh Steelers on Monday Night Football, Lawrence recorded his first sack of the season on Ben Roethlisberger during the 26–16 loss.

During the Week 2 game of the 2021 season against the Washington Football Team, Lawrence jumped offside on the final play of the 4th quarter during a Dustin Hopkins missed field goal nullifying the Washington kick attempt. The Giants would lose 29–30 on Hopkins' re-kick, dropping them 0–2 for the fifth consecutive season.

On April 28, 2022, the Giants picked up the fifth-year option on Lawrence’s rookie contract.

References

External links
 Sports Reference (college)
Clemson Tigers bio
New York Giants bio

1997 births
Living people
African-American players of American football
People from Wake Forest, North Carolina
Players of American football from North Carolina
American football defensive tackles
Clemson Tigers football players
New York Giants players
21st-century African-American sportspeople
National Conference Pro Bowl players